John Corbett Glover (4 July 1909 – 1 January 1949) was a Catholic priest who was responsible for the successful evacuation of civilians trapped in the New Guinea Highlands in 1942 after the Japanese landings at Lae and Salamaua.

Early life 

His family lived at Whorouly, a small settlement on the Ovens River between Myrtleford and Wangaratta in Victoria, Australia.

Glover was ordained to the priesthood on 6 January 1932 at St Patrick's Church, Albury, by Bishop Joseph Wilfrid Dwyer of Wagga. He received his primary education at the Christian Brothers' College, Albury, and later attended the Ecclesiastical College at Manly.

Fr Glover first learnt to fly with Butler Air Transport Co. while a Parish Priest at Cootamundra, New South Wales, in 1936. He was posted to New Guinea with the Divine Word Mission in 1938 where he began flying aircraft for the Mission in 1940.

World War II 
On 14 February 1942, the day that civil governance of Papua ceased, Fr. Glover joined the New Guinea Volunteer Rifles at Wau and was given the rank of Warrant Officer II by the NGVR Commanding Officer Major W.M. Edwards. On 7 March he was given the rank of lieutenant.

Following Prime Minister John Curtin's declaration of war with Japan on 8 December 1941, hundreds of civilians had been flown to Port Moresby from Wewak, Lae, Salamaua, Bulolo and Wau, by many people, including veteran miner Norman Wilde, who evacuated 11 Chinese from Salamaua in his Tiger Moth.

A few others, including three Seventh-day Adventist missionaries, were left in the highlands after the evacuation of the Papuan Gulf area. These were Dave Brennan at the Omaura Training School, Alex J. Campbell, pastor at the highlands headquarters (Ramu,
Kainantu), and Stuart Gander further west at Benabena.

Due to the rapid deterioration of affairs at Rabaul, no news had reached them, and they were unaware of permission to leave. Some others made a journey from the May River over the divide to Daru on foot. Others walked from Madang to the highlands centre of Kainantu.

After the town of Wau and Father Glover's church had been strafed by Japanese Zeros, he helped to evacuate Europeans from the Markham Valley. This included some people from Manus Island and survivors of the massacres in New Britain. Flying a Spartan 2-seater from Wau, re-built and maintained by Hungarian Karl Nagy, who had been Guinea Airways' chief engineer, Fr. Glover flew people to Port Moresby via Wau. As time went on this route became too dangerous, so they hid the Spartan in the gardens of the Seventh-day Adventist Mission Headquarters at Kainantu where Alex J. Campbell was in charge.

Glover and Nagy then set out to walk to Madang, taking nine days instead of the usual four to make the trip. At Madang they knew a Fox-Moth 4-seater was still intact at the Catholic Mission's headquarters on Sek Island. The Moth was floated thirteen miles down the coast on a raft made from fuel drums, and while they worked on it near the Madang airfield, two air attacks took place. The plane remained intact and they flew it back to the Mission station at Kainantu. Here they worked on both planes and made a spare fuel tank for the Moth out of some leftover galvanised iron. It was hoped this would extend the range to enable it to reach Cairns to arrange evacuation of the refugees in the Highlands.

Fr. Glover then decided to ferry some sick civilians to Mt. Hagen. Using the Spartan on the first trip, he found it wasn't powerful enough to get over the Purari Divide and had to return to Kainantu. On landing, he ran into the trip wire that had been strung across the strip to thwart enemy aircraft. He and his passenger weren't hurt, but the propeller on the Spartan was irreparably damaged.

There were fifty people at Kainantu at this time and Fr Glover obviously thought that flying them out in the Moth was not a practical undertaking. He proposed a plan that seemed suicidal – to fly to Mt. Hagen and then on to Thursday Island to alert the authorities to the plight of the people stranded in the highlands.

They worked on the Moth for a week; in that time they made an auxiliary fuel tank out of some scrap galvanised iron and joined it to the existing tank with a piece of copper tube that Alex Campbell had salvaged from a plane that had crashed there in 1937. Nagy was to sit in the back nursing a bed pan full of extra fuel and transfer it to the main fuel tank with a large enema syringe donated by Alex Campbell from his store of medical supplies. The first attempt at reaching Mt. Hagen failed, but after some further modifications to the Moth a second attempt succeeded.

On 28 March 1942 they left Mt. Hagen and crossed the mountains to the southern coast, where they ran into some very bad weather and made a forced landing on a beach to the west of Daru with only a cup full of fuel remaining. Here they persuaded some local natives to row them to Thursday Island. On the way they transferred to a lugger which took them the remaining distance to Thursday Island.

Meanwhile, the people at Kainantu weren't aware that Fr. Glover had actually made his destination and groups of people had set out on foot for Mt. Hagen. The mission station had been taken over by the Australian military and was being used as a hospital. Campbell was undecided whether or not to start out for Mt. Hagen with the few remaining civilians until he heard over the radio that some American missionaries had been imprisoned by the Japanese on Bougainville. He then realised that the enemy weren't going to regard the missionaries as neutral.

On 10 April 1942 the army asked Campbell if he wished to evacuate as they couldn't guarantee any support if he stayed. The mission had been bombed with minor damage resulting, but enemy planes were in the skies all around. He decided to leave and sent word to fellow missionaries Brennan and Gander to join him. Brennan walked in from Omaura six days later, and together they set off on the 320 km trek, picking up Gander along the way at Bena Bena.

They crossed the Gafuka Valley and went through the Mairi Gorge, across the Chimbu River and on up the Wahgi Valley, reaching Mt. Hagen after nine days. There they waited with 80 others until on 13 May the first rescue planes arrived from Horne Island and they began to take them to safety.

References 

1942 in Papua New Guinea
Papua New Guinea in World War II
Australian people of Irish descent
Australian Army personnel of World War II
People from Victoria (Australia)
20th-century Australian Roman Catholic priests
1909 births
1949 deaths